Volleyball World Cup Detailed Palmares may refer to:
 FIVB Volleyball Men's World Cup
 FIVB Volleyball Women's World Cup